Sunday Morning at the Centre of the World was written by Louis De Bernieres in 2001 and released as a play for voices.
 
It received one performance in a BBC Radio 3 broadcast, and is a popular text for A-level or GCSE courses in drama or performing arts.

Sunday Morning consists of a diverse culture, Earlsfield, of people of different ethnic and social backgrounds and their interactions and, sometimes dramatic, confrontations.

It is said to be roughly based on De Bernieres' own experiences living above a shop for several years, in a South London community.

It has been said to have been influenced by Dylan Thomas's Under Milk Wood.

2001 plays